African Junior Championships may refer to: 

African Junior Athletics Championships
African Handball Junior Nations Championship
African Youth Championship (football)
African Under-17 Championship (football)
African Volleyball Championship U21
African Volleyball Championship U19
Women's Africa Volleyball Championship U20
Girls' Africa Volleyball Championship U18